
Miechów County is a unit of territorial administration and local government (powiat) in Lesser Poland Voivodeship, southern Poland. It came into being on January 1, 1999, as a result of the Polish local government reforms passed in 1998.

As of 2019 its total population is 48,948, out of which the population of Miechów is 11,612 and the rural population is 37,336.

Neighbouring counties
Miechów County is bordered by Jędrzejów County to the north, Pińczów County and Kazimierza County to the east, Proszowice County to the south-east, Kraków County to the south, and Olkusz County and Zawiercie County to the west.

Administrative division
The county is subdivided into seven gminas (one urban-rural and six rural). These are listed in the following table, in descending order of population.

References

 
Land counties of Lesser Poland Voivodeship